Erich Eduard "Edi" Schönecker (January 21, 1885 – April 6, 1963) was an Austrian athlete, football (soccer) player, and architect.  He competed at the 1908 Summer Olympics in London.

Biography
In the 100 metres event, Schönecker finished fourth place in his first round heat and did not advance to the semifinals. He placed third in his preliminary heat of the 200 metres competition to be eliminated from that event as well. He played football for SK Rapid Wien and was able to win 1 cap for Austria. He is also well known for building sport stadiums. He designed the Stadium Pfarrwiese, which was the home of Rapid Wien until 1981. And he was responsible for the construction of the Hohe Warte Stadium, which is the home of Austrias oldest football club First Vienna FC. This stadium was the biggest in Europe at this time and is still in use.

References

Sources
 Eduard Schönecker's profile at Sports Reference.com
 Biography of Eduard Schönecker 
 
 
 

1885 births
1963 deaths
Athletes (track and field) at the 1908 Summer Olympics
Olympic athletes of Austria
Austrian male sprinters
Austrian footballers
SK Rapid Wien players
Austria international footballers
Austrian architects
Association football forwards